Dorothea Maria of Anhalt (Dessau, 2 July 1574 – Weimar, 18 July 1617), was by birth a member of the House of Ascania and princess of Anhalt.  After her marriage, she became Duchess of Saxe-Weimar.

Dorothea Maria was the sixth daughter of Joachim Ernest, Prince of Anhalt, but second-born daughter by his second wife Eleonore, daughter of Christoph, Duke of Württemberg.

Life
In 1586, the twelve-year-old Dorothea Maria was chosen by her father as Abbess of Gernrode and Frose as the successor to her elder sister Agnes Hedwig.

In 1593 she was relieved of her post as abbess in order to marry John II, Duke of Saxe-Weimar. The wedding took place in Altenburg on 7 January of that year. Her successor as abbess was her niece, Sophie Elisabeth, eldest daughter of her half-brother John George I, Prince of Anhalt-Dessau.

During the twelve years of her marriage, Dorothea Maria gave birth to twelve children (the last one born posthumously), including Ernst I of Saxe-Gotha and the famous general Bernhard of Saxe-Weimar.

Dorothea Maria died of injuries sustained while riding a horse. Her funeral took place on 24 August 1617 at Schloss Hornstein (later Wilhelmsburg Castle). On this occasion, the Fruitbearing Society was created and her younger brother, Louis of Anhalt-Köthen, was appointed its first leader.

References

|-

|-

|-

1574 births
1617 deaths
People from Dessau-Roßlau
House of Wettin
House of Ascania
Duchesses of Saxe-Weimar
Gernrode
Daughters of monarchs